= Chandrupatla, Khammam district =

Village in Telangana state, India

Coordinates: 18°33′N 80°24′E

Chandrupatla is a village in earst while Jayashankar Bhupalpally(Mulugu new) in Telangana state, India. It falls under Wazeedu mandal.

The major occupation in this village is agriculture (Paddy and Mirchi). It is connected to Wazeedu by the road way. Chandrupatla village on google maps
